Sidemoor is a village within the urban area of Bromsgrove, Worcestershire.

The local school, Sidemoor First School, opened in 1884 and was relocated in 2007 to a new site on the edge of the village using money from a private finance initiative.

As a result of high housing costs in the town, plans have been submitted to construct more affordable housing in the area, both on the former school site and nearby to the new school.

Transport

Bus

References

Villages in Worcestershire
Bromsgrove